Rakes may refer to:

 Joel Rakes (born 1986), American musician
 The Rakes, an English indie rock band

See also

 Rake (disambiguation)